Chapel Hill is an unincorporated community in Polk Township, Monroe County, in the U.S. state of Indiana.

History
Chapel Hill was platted in 1856. The community took its name from the Chapel Hill Methodist Church located there. The community ultimately would fail to grow to its founders' expectations. A post office was established at Chapel Hill in 1897, and remained in operation until it was discontinued in 1925.

Geography

References

Unincorporated communities in Monroe County, Indiana
Unincorporated communities in Indiana